Joan Molina (November 15, 1940 – October 4, 2014) was a Spanish film and television actor, best known for his roles on L'Alqueria Blanca, in which he portrayed the mayor, and Doctor Mateo.

Molina was born in San Jorge, Castellón, Valencian Community, on November 15, 1940. He died on the morning of October 4, 2014, in Valencia, Spain, at the age of 73.

Filmography

Televisión 
 L'Alqueria Blanca (2007–2010) on Canal 9
 Doctor Mateo (2009–2011) on Antena 3
 Yo soy Bea (2009) om Telecinco
 Hospital Central (2005) on Telecinco
 Cuéntame cómo pasó (2002) en La 1

References

External links

1940 births
2014 deaths
Spanish male television actors
Spanish male film actors
People from Baix Maestrat
21st-century Spanish male actors